Weatherhead High School is a single sex girls' academy school with mixed Sixth Form, located in Merseyside, England in the Metropolitan Borough of Wirral. In 2003, the school relocated from three separate sites around the Wallasey area to a new purpose-built state of the art site on Breck Road.

The school has over 1500 pupils on roll, ranging from 11 to 18. There is a mixed Sixth Form of up to 400 students.

The school has held the Sportsmark Award and the Artsmark Gold Award for several years,.

Former students include Melissa Jane Wild, author of many short stories and the published fantasy story 'The Darkness Within'; Dr Katie Petty-Saphon, MBE,
Weatherhead  Alumna (1962-1969), Cambridge  Alumna (Newnham College) and Chief Executive of the Medical Schools Council; British & Olympic Boxer, Natasha Jonas, Weatherhead Alumna (1995-2002)

References

Academies in the Metropolitan Borough of Wirral
Girls' schools in Merseyside
Secondary schools in the Metropolitan Borough of Wirral
Wallasey